Rykalovskaya is a rural locality (a village) in Spasskoye Rural Settlement, Tarnogsky District, Vologda Oblast, Russia. The population was 2 as of 2002.

Geography 
Rykalovskaya is located 36 km northwest of Tarnogsky Gorodok (the district's administrative centre) by road. Gorka is the nearest rural locality.

References 

Rural localities in Tarnogsky District